Endangered Girls (German: Gefährdete Mädchen) is a 1927 German silent film directed by Heinz Schall and starring Nina Vanna, Margarete Kupfer and Harry Hardt.

The film's sets were designed by the art director Karl Machus.

Cast
 Nina Vanna
 Margarete Kupfer
 Harry Hardt
 Kurt Gerron
 Ferry Sikla
 Carl de Vogt

References

Bibliography
 Barbara Felsmann & Karl Prümm. Kurt Gerron - gefeiert und gejagt. Edition Hentrich, 1992.

External links

1927 films
Films of the Weimar Republic
German silent feature films
German black-and-white films
Films directed by Heinz Schall